Ouray may refer to:

Places in the United States
 Ouray County, Colorado
 Ouray, Colorado, a small city
 Ouray Peak, Colorado
 Mount Ouray, Colorado
 Ouray, Utah, a village
 Ouray National Wildlife Refuge, Randlett, Utah

People
 Ouray (Ute leader) (1833–1880), Native American chief of a band of the Ute tribe

See also
 Uintah and Ouray Indian Reservation